The McKee Mk.14, is a special purpose-built American sports prototype race car, designed, developed and built by Bob McKee, and built to Group 7 specifications, for the Can-Am series, in 1969. It was experimental, but ultimately unsuccessful, failing to start the only race it entered; the 1969 Road America Can-Am round.

References

Sports prototypes
1960s cars
Cars of the United States
Can-Am cars